Mary Dolores Kelly (born 3 September 1959) is a Social Democratic and Labour Party (SDLP) politician. She was a Member of the Northern Ireland Assembly (MLA) for Upper Bann from 2003 until 2016, and again from 2017 until 2022.

Background
Dolores Kelly attended St Michael's Grammar School, Lurgan and then the University of Ulster, Jordanstown. She worked as an occupational therapist in the Craigavon Area Hospital and in social services in Banbridge. She married Eamon Kelly in 1982 and has four children.

Political career
In May 1993 she was first elected to Craigavon Borough Council for the Loughside District. She served on all committees, and was chair of Technical Services and Environmental Services. In 1996 she was an unsuccessful candidate in the Northern Ireland Forum election in Upper Bann.
 
In May 1997 she was re-elected to Craigavon Borough. She was elected Deputy Mayor in 1998 and from 1999 to 2000 was the first SDLP Mayor of Craigavon. Kelly was also deputy leader of the SDLP from 2011 to 2015.

In 2004, Kelly was the target of death threats from dissident Republicans, and her home was attacked. In 2009, Kelly was threatened by a masked gunman while canvassing in the Kilwilkie estate in Lurgan.

In 2003 Kelly was elected to Northern Ireland Assembly for Upper Bann. She was a member of the Northern Ireland Policing Board. She lost her seat in the 2016 Assembly election but regained it and rejoined the Policing Board in 2017, at the expense of Sinn Féin.

She lost her seat in the 2022 Northern Ireland Assembly election.

Political positions 
Kelly has called for the establishment of an all-island registry for those convicted of animal cruelty.

References

1959 births
Living people
Members of Craigavon Borough Council
Northern Ireland MLAs 2003–2007
Northern Ireland MLAs 2007–2011
Northern Ireland MLAs 2011–2016
Northern Ireland MLAs 2017–2022
Social Democratic and Labour Party MLAs
Female members of the Northern Ireland Assembly
Alumni of Ulster University
Women mayors of places in Northern Ireland
Mayors of Craigavon
Women councillors in Northern Ireland
Occupational therapists